Paul-Émile Allard (July 15, 1920 – January 6, 1995) was a Canadian provincial politician. He was the Union Nationale member of the Legislative Assembly of Quebec for Beauce from 1962 to 1970. He was the Minister of Natural Resources from 1967 to 1970. He was also mayor of Saint-Joseph-de-Beauce, Quebec from 1959 to 1965.

References

1920 births
1995 deaths
Mayors of places in Quebec
People from Gaspésie–Îles-de-la-Madeleine
Union Nationale (Quebec) MNAs